The Talimali Band of Apalachee Indians is one of several cultural heritage organizations of individuals who identify as descendants of the Apalachee people. The historical Apalachee were a Muskogean language-speaking tribe who lived at the Florida-Georgia border north of the Gulf of Mexico until the beginning of the 18th century.

The Talimali Band of Apalachee Indians is one of more than 517 unrecognized organizations. This organization is neither a federally recognized tribe nor a state-recognized tribe. 

They were previously called the Apalachee Indians of Louisiana. About 300 people belong to this organization.

Nonprofit organizations 
In 1995, the Talimali Band of Apalachee Indians organized as a 501(c)(3) nonprofit organization, based in Pineville, Louisiana.

Arthur R. Bennett was the organization's principal officer. Zina Lee Spears served as the organization's registered agent. Arthur R. Bennett currently leads the organization.

There is also the Apalachee Indians Talimali Band, formed by Troy Kerry in 2019, based in Stonewall, Louisiana. Kerry registered this group as a 501(c)(3) nonprofit with the EIN of 84-3710212 in 2019. This newer organization tried and failed to gain state recognition from Louisiana in 2022.

Petition for federal recognition 
The Talimali Band, The Apalachee Indians of Louisiana, formerly called the Apalachee Indians of Louisiana sent a letter of intent to petition for federal recognition in 1996. Gilmer Bennett of Libuse, Louisiana, sent the letter. The Talimali Band never submitted a completed petition for federal recognition.

This group is not to be confused with the Apalachee Indian Tribe in Alexandria, Louisiana, another unrecognized organization claiming Apalachee identity who also submitted a letter of intent to petition for federal recognition in 1996.

Status 

The Louisiana Office of Indian Affairs oversees state–tribal relations, and there are 11 state-recognized tribes in Louisiana Four federally recognized tribes are headquartered in Louisiana. State and Federal Recognition of Tribes serves as a tool to identify tribal communities that can exist as sovereign entities under the Trust Responsibility and is not a declaration of a tribe's historical legitimacy.

In 2019, Senator Gerald Long introduced Louisiana Senate Concurrent Resolution 9, titled "Recognizes the Apalachee Indians' Talimali Band as a tribe in the state of Louisiana," which died in committee that same year.

Regarding the band's attempts to receive state recognition, Louisiana State Senator Louie Bernard stated: "All of us have this lingering thing that we’ve had forever, that anybody that seeks recognition and in this fashion has another motive in mind. And we all know what that is. But I guess I’m just naive enough to believe that some of these tribes really are not interested in that. They are interested solely in having the pride of having been recognized by their state as who they say they are."

The topic of federal and state recognition is a controversial one among the estimated 400 unrecognized tribes.

Legal issues 
In 2020, Troy Kerry, chief and chairman of the Apalachee Indians Talimali Band, sued the Talimali Band of the Apalachee Indians in Chief Troy Kerry v. Talimali Band of the Apalachee Indians in the USPTO Trademark Trial and Appeal Board, case no. 92074759-CAN. In 2021, the organization countersued in Talimali Band the Apalachee Indians of Louisiana v. Apalachee Indians Talimali Band et al in the US District Court for the Western District of Louisiana.

Activities 
Officials from the Talimali Band of the Apalachee participated in the inaugural Supreme Chiefs Council that met in Oakdale, Louisiana, in 2020.

See also 
 List of unrecognized tribes in the United States

References

External links
 Talimali Band of the Apalachee Indians of Louisiana, Pineville, LA, organized 1995
 Apalachee Indians of the Talimali Band, Stonewall, LA, organized 2019

Cultural organizations based in Louisiana
Non-profit organizations based in Louisiana
1995 establishments in Louisiana
Unrecognized tribes in the United States